Rosa Juliana Sánchez de Tagle y Hidalgo, Marquesa of Torre Tagle (1647 – November 11, 1761) was a Peruvian aristocrat who descended from an important and influential Spanish aristocratic family which included the Marquis of Altamira. She also a shares the same ancestor as her husband the Marquis of Torre Tagle, as they both descended from the ancient line of Tagle founded in the Kingdom of Asturias.

Rosa Juliana was the daughter of Don Francisco Sánchez de Tagle y Castro Velarde and Doña María Josefa Hidalgo Sánchez y Velásquez Gómez, both Spanish Hidalgos. She was born is San Jerónimo de Sayán, Huaura, Lima, Peru on 1647.

She married Don José Bernardo de Tagle y Bracho, 1st Marquis of Torre Tagle at Parroquia el Sagrario de la Catedral de Lima in Peru, and lived at the exquisite Torre Tagle Palace.

Both Sánchez de Tagle y Hidalgo and Ana Maria, Empress of Mexico descended from the line of the Marquis of Altamira and members of the Tagle Family.

References
 Tagle. Enigma de un nombre, Historia de un pueblo. Author: José Luis Sáiz Fernández
 Nobleza Colonial de Chile. Author: J. Mujica
 Diccionario Heráldico y Genealógico de Apellidos Españoles. Author: Alberto y Arturo García Garrafa
 Nobiliario de los reinos y Señorios de España. Author: Francisco Piferrer
 La Sociedad Chilena del siglo XVIII, Mayorazgos y Títulos de Castilla. Author: Domingo Amunátegui Solar

External links
 http://gw1.geneanet.org/index.php3?b=fracarbo&lang=en;p=jose+bernardo;n=de+tagle+bracho+y+perez+de+la+riva
 https://web.archive.org/web/20090220114504/http://per-can.com/CarpD/deTagle/deTagle.htm#Biografia

17th-century Spanish nobility
Mexican nobility
1647 births
1761 deaths
18th-century Spanish nobility
18th-century Peruvian women